Fiji sent a team to compete in the 2008 Summer Olympics in Beijing, China. The country's flagbearer during the Games' opening ceremony was female sprinter Makelesi Bulikiobo. Fiji was represented by a total of six athletes.

Athletics

Men

Women

Key
Note–Ranks given for track events are within the athlete's heat only
Q = Qualified for the next round
q = Qualified for the next round as a fastest loser or, in field events, by position without achieving the qualifying target
NR = National record
N/A = Round not applicable for the event
Bye = Athlete not required to compete in round

Judo

Fiji had received a berth in judo.

Shooting

Glenn Kable represented Fiji in shooting.

Men

Swimming

Two of Fiji's top swimmers, Caroline Pickering Puamau and Rachel Ah Koy, declined to seek qualification, leaving Carl Probert as the only Fiji Islander swimmer seeking to qualify for the 2008 Games. Probert, who has taken part in every Summer Olympics since 1992, subsequently qualified for the Beijing Games.

Men

Weightlifting

See also
 Fiji at the 2008 Summer Paralympics

References

Nations at the 2008 Summer Olympics
2008
Olympics